The Southwest Australia savanna is an ecoregion in Western Australia.

Location and description
The southwest Australia savanna is at the transition between the Mediterranean climate ecoregions of Australia's southwest corner and the deserts and xeric shrublands to the north and inland. Much of the area is now converted to wheat-growing. The latitude of this region is 8° to 20° on the equator.

The ecoregion is bounded by the drier Carnarvon xeric shrublands to the north, and the Western Australian Mulga shrublands to the northeast. Mediterranean-climate ecoregions lie to the east and south – the Coolgardie woodlands to the east, the Esperance mallee to the southeast, and the Southwest Australia woodlands to the southwest. It is bounded on the west by the Indian Ocean.

The ecoregion contains three Interim Biogeographic Regionalisation for Australia (IBRA) regions – Avon Wheatbelt, Geraldton Sandplains, and Yalgoo.

Flora
The ecoregion is part of the Southwest Australia biodiversity hotspot.

The original habitat consists of savanna dotted with eucalyptus woodland, mallee woodlands and shrublands, and heath. Although the more fertile southern areas have now mostly been converted to wheat fields, more original savanna remains in the north of the region where there are more acacia trees than eucalyptus. Plants of the region include many wildflowers and trees including the scented Acacia rostellifera. The best-preserved area of original habitat is found in and around the multi-colored sandstone gorges of Kalbarri National Park on the Murchison River.

Fauna
Birds of the area include the emu, although this has been hunted as a pest by the wheat-growing community, and the honey-eating western spinebill. Mammals include the honey possum (Tarsipes rostratus) and the southwestern pygmy possum (Cercartetus concinnus), both of which feed on nectar from the wildflowers.

Protected Areas
A 2017 assessment found that 15,778 km², or 9%, of the ecoregion is in protected areas. They include Kalbarri National Park, Alexander Morrison National Park, Badgingarra National Park, Beekeepers Nature Reserve, Pinjarrega Nature Reserve, Toolonga Nature Reserve, Wandana Nature Reserve, and Zuytdorp Nature Reserve.

See also
 Southwest Australia woodlands
 Southwest Australia

References

Grasslands of Australia
Mediterranean forests, woodlands, and scrub in Australia
Southwest Australia
Ecoregions of Western Australia
Temperate grasslands, savannas, and shrublands